Troides criton, the Criton birdwing, is a birdwing butterfly found on the islands of Morotai, Halmahera, Bali, Bacan, Ternate and Obi in Indonesia.

Description

Troides criton is sexually dimorphic.

Male: The ground colour of the forewings is black. A large discal golden area has veins are black veins. The underside is very similar.

Female: In the female some of the veins are bordered by white. There is a chain of internervular black spots in the golden area. The underside is very similar.

In both sexes the abdomen is brown with a yellow underside. The head and thorax are black and the underside of thorax has a red hair.

Subspecies
Troides criton criton Sulawesi, Moluccas, Morotai, Ternate, Tidore, Halmahera, Kasiruta, Sula Islands, Bacan
Troides criton critonides (Fruhstorfer, 1903) Obi Islands

Related species
Troides criton is a member of the Troides haliphron species group. The members of this clade are:

Troides haliphron (Boisduval, 1836)
Troides darsius (Gray, [1853])
Troides vandepolli (Snellen, 1890)
Troides criton (C. & R. Felder, 1860)
Troides riedeli (Kirsch, 1885)
Troides plato (Wallace, 1865)
Troides staudingeri (Röber, 1888)

References

D'Abrera, B. (1975). Birdwing Butterflies of the World. Country Life Books, London.

Felder, C. & R. Felder (1865-1875). Rhopalocera. In Reise der Osterreichischen Fregatte "Novara" um die Erde in den Jahren 1857, 1858, 1859 unter den Befehlen Commodore B. von Wullerstorf-Urbair. Zoologischer Theil. Zweiter Band:Abtheilung. Wien: vi + 548 + [1] pp in 5 parts, 140 pls.
Haugum, J. & Low, A.M. (1978-1985). A Monograph of the Birdwing Butterflies. 2 volumes. Scandinavian Press, Klampenborg; 663 pp.
Kurt Rumbucher and Oliver Schäffler (2004). Part 19, Papilionidae X. Troides III. in Erich Bauer and Thomas Frankenbach Eds. Butterflies of the World. Keltern: Goecke & Evers

External links

Butterflycorner Images from Naturhistorisches Museum Wien (English/German)
Nagypal
Halmahera Rain Forests Ecoregion
Sulawesi Lowland Rain Forests

Criton
Butterflies of Indonesia
Endemic fauna of Indonesia
Fauna of Bali
Fauna of the Maluku Islands
Fauna of Halmahera
Fauna of Ternate
Taxa named by Baron Cajetan von Felder
Butterflies described in 1860